Furukawa Dam  is a gravity dam located in Hokkaido Prefecture in Japan. The dam is used for power production. The catchment area of the dam is 569.8 km2. The dam impounds about 4  ha of land when full and can store 307 thousand cubic meters of water. The construction of the dam was started on 1928 and completed in 1929.

References

Dams in Hokkaido